Li Ling (born 14 March 1986 in Binzhou, Shandong) is a Chinese windsurfer, who specialized in Neil Pryde RS:X class. As of March 2013, Li is ranked no. 39 in the world for the sailboard class by the International Sailing Federation.

Li competed in the women's RS:X class at the 2012 Summer Olympics in London by receiving a berth from the World Championships in Cadiz, Spain. She finished fourteenth in a fleet of twenty-six sailors with an accumulated net score of 115, missing out on the top ten medal race by 25 points.

References

External links
 
 
 
 

1986 births
Living people
Chinese female sailors (sport)
Olympic sailors of China
Sailors at the 2012 Summer Olympics – RS:X
People from Binzhou
Sportspeople from Shandong
21st-century Chinese women
Chinese windsurfers
Female windsurfers